Donna Frame Tuttle (born April 21, 1947) is an American businesswoman who served as the Under Secretary of Commerce for Travel and Tourism from 1983 to 1988 and as the United States Deputy Secretary of Commerce from 1988 to 1989.

References

1947 births
Living people
United States Deputy Secretaries of Commerce
California Republicans